Garcinia sessilis, commonly known as heilala in Tongan, is an evergreen tree native to the Pacific regions of Solomon Islands, Fiji, Samoa and Tonga. The heilala flower is the national flower of Tonga.

Description
Garcinia sessilis, which can also be known as heilala in Tonga or seilala in Samoa, can grow anywhere from 4 to 20 meters tall and can have a bole up to 30 cm in diameter. The Garcinia sessilis comes from the genus of Garcinia, which are native to regions of Asia, America, Australia, Africa, and Polynesia. With this, Garcinia sessilis is a fruiting plant native to various islands in the Pacific: Solomon Islands, Fiji, Samoa, and Tonga. The tree produces flowers that range in color from pale yellow or pink tinged, to a coral red or carmine, and the fruits range from a yellowish white to red at maturity. Garcinia sessilis can have many uses, ranging from medicine and food, to creating material objects from various parts of the tree. In the country of Tonga, the Garcinia sessilis is an ornamental plant, having been seen as both sacred and representing royalty.

Taxonomy
The Garcinia Sessilis is from the genus of Garcinia, a genus of flowering plants that are native to various places across the world, including: Asia, America, Australia, Africa, and Polynesia. This species of Garcinia are specifically located in various islands of the Pacific, including: Solomon Islands, Fiji, Samoa, and Tonga.

Distribution and Habitat
The Garcinia Sessilis is a fruiting plant indigenous in the Pacific, specifically on the Solomon Islands, Fiji, Samoa, and Tonga. Here, the plant grows in a multitude of varying habitats, ranging from both wet and dry forests, on the edges of mangrove swamps, in open thickets, as well as dense or dry forests. Garcinia Sessilis seemings grow and can thrive in all environments on their islands, ranging from sea level up to around 1,150 meters. With this, the Garcinia Sessilis does not appear to be at any significant risk, being classified as “Least Concerning” by the IUCN Red List of threatened species.

Uses
The Garcinia sessilis has a variety of uses across the islands that it inhabits. Probably the most obvious use could come from the fruit, which is edible. The fruit is identifiable as a red, obovoid around 4 centimeters long, and can be eaten raw. Along with being edible, the Garcinia sessilis also has various medical uses. The first of which uses the leaves of the plant rather than the fruit. Crushing the leaves in some water creates an eye wash used for various eye related problems. The bark of the plant can also be used medicinally.

Alone with being used for food and medicine, the Garcinia is used for more material items. The flowers of the tree can be used to scent coconut oil or are commonly turned into necklaces. Wood is also used from the tree, which is used to build homes on its native islands. The people that have come to inhabit these islands seemingly use all parts of this plant, leaving none to waste as everything has a use.

Culture
The Garcinia sessilis has become a largely important plant in Tonga. Planted as ornamental, the Tonga revear the heleila as sacred, and is used as a symbol of royalty. With this, Tonga also made their national flower the Red-Blossomed Heleila and have a festival celebrating the heleila, called the Fourth of July.

References 

sessilis
Medicinal plants
Tongan culture